In statistics, the ordered logit model (also ordered logistic regression or proportional odds model) is an ordinal regression model—that is, a regression model for ordinal dependent variables—first considered by Peter McCullagh.  For example, if one question on a survey is to be answered by a choice among "poor", "fair", "good", "very good" and "excellent", and the purpose of the analysis is to see how well that response can be predicted by the responses to other questions, some of which may be quantitative, then ordered logistic regression may be used.  It can be thought of as an extension of the logistic regression model that applies to dichotomous dependent variables, allowing for more than two (ordered) response categories.

The model and the proportional odds assumption

The model only applies to data that meet the proportional odds assumption, the meaning of which can be exemplified as follows. Suppose there are five outcomes: "poor", "fair", "good", "very good", and "excellent".  We assume that the probabilities of these outcomes are given by p1(x), p2(x), p3(x), p4(x), p5(x), all of which are functions of some independent variable(s) x.  Then, for a fixed value of x, the logarithms of the odds (not the logarithms of the probabilities) of answering in certain ways are:

 

The proportional odds assumption states that the numbers added to each of these logarithms to get the next are the same regardless of x.  In other words, the difference between the logarithm of the odds of having poor or fair health minus the logarithm of having poor health is the same regardless of x; similarly, the logarithm of the odds of having poor, fair, or good health minus the logarithm of having poor or fair health is the same regardless of x; etc. 

Examples of multiple-ordered response categories include bond ratings, opinion surveys with responses ranging from "strongly agree" to "strongly disagree," levels of state spending on government programs (high, medium, or low), the level of insurance coverage chosen (none, partial, or full), and employment status (not employed, employed part-time, or fully employed).

Ordered logit can be derived from a latent-variable model, similar to the one from which binary logistic regression can be derived. Suppose the underlying process to be characterized is

Further suppose that while we cannot observe , we instead can only observe the categories of response

where the parameters  are the externally imposed endpoints of the observable categories. Then the ordered logit technique will use the observations on y, which are a form of censored data on y*, to fit the parameter vector .

Estimation

For details on how the equation is estimated, see the article Ordinal regression.

See also

Multinomial logit
Multinomial probit
Ordered probit

References

Further reading

External links

 

Logistic regression